David Paul Ramsey (born November 17, 1971) is an American actor, director, and martial artist. He is best known for his roles in The CW Arrowverse series Arrow, The Flash, Supergirl, and Batwoman as John Diggle / Spartan, portraying Diggle and Bass Reeves in Legends of Tomorrow, recurring as an alternate universe version of Diggle in Superman & Lois, recurring as Anton Briggs on the Showtime TV series Dexter, and starring in the film Mother and Child (2009) as Joseph.

Early life
Ramsey was born November 17, 1971, in Detroit, Michigan. He graduated from Wayne State University.

Career
From 1997 to 1998, he starred in the UPN sitcom Good News, as pastor David Randolph. In 2000, he starred as Muhammad Ali in the Fox television film Ali: An American Hero. That year, he appeared in Pay It Forward and started a recurring role in For Your Love. In 2001, he starred as Vince Lee in the South African comedy film "Mr Bones". He has also starred in recurring roles in All of Us, One on One, The West Wing, CSI: Crime Scene Investigation, Ghost Whisperer, Wildfire, and Hollywood Residential. From 2008 to 2009, he appeared in 17 episodes of Dexter as Anton Briggs, a pot-smoking confidential informant who has an affair with Debra Morgan in Season 3 and at the start of Season 4. In 2010, he appeared in an episode of Grey's Anatomy and in the short-lived NBC courtroom drama series Outlaw. From 2012 to 2020, he appeared in the main cast of CW's superhero show Arrow, as John Diggle, a military veteran who is Oliver's partner, confidant, bodyguard, and later gained an alter ego, Spartan, since the fourth season. The season seven episode "Past Sins" was Ramsey's directorial debut. As part of the greater Arrowverse, Ramsey has reprised his role as Diggle on The Flash, Legends of Tomorrow, Supergirl and Batwoman, as well as portraying an alternate version of the character on the non-Arrowverse Superman & Lois. Ramsey also starred in the TV series Blue Bloods as Mayor Carter Poole.

Personal life
Ramsey is an accomplished martial artist in Jeet Kune Do. He has also studied boxing, taekwondo and Wing Chun, and trained in kickboxing under Benny "Jet" Urquidez.

Filmography

Film

Television

Director

References

External links

Notes

1971 births
20th-century American male actors
21st-century American male actors
American male boxers
American Jeet Kune Do practitioners
American male kickboxers
American male taekwondo practitioners
American Wing Chun practitioners
American television directors
American male film actors
American male television actors
African-American male actors
Living people
Male actors from Detroit
Wayne State University alumni